Silvia Rinka (later Madeja, born 27 July 1962) is an East German swimmer who competed in the late 1970s and early 1980s. Competing in the breaststroke, she finished eighth in the 200 m breaststroke event at the 1980 Summer Olympics in Moscow.

Rinka is married to Uwe Madeja, who won the silver medal in the canoeing C-2 1000 m event at those same games.

References
Sports-reference.com profile

1962 births
German female swimmers
Living people
Olympic swimmers of East Germany
Swimmers at the 1980 Summer Olympics
German female breaststroke swimmers